William Moffat (January 20, 1847 – September 5, 1926) was a Canadian politician from Alberta.

Early life

William Moffat was born January 20, 1847, in Carleton Place, Ontario to Robert Moffatt and Mary Ann Saunders. He was educated at Carleton Place and married Flora McLean on February 5, 1873, and together had seven children.

Political life

William Moffat was the Town of Claresholm's first resident and Mayor. He was first elected to the Alberta Legislature in the 1913 general election to the Claresholm under the banner of the Alberta Liberal Party. He defeated Conservative candidate D.S. McMillan and Independent candidate G. Malshow.  In the 1917 general election  he was defeated by Louise McKinney, who thus became the first woman elected to a Legislature in the British Empire.

Later life
Moffat died on September 5, 1926.

References

External links
 
Alberta Legislative Assembly Members Listing

Alberta Liberal Party MLAs
Mayors of places in Alberta
1847 births
1926 deaths